Lord Jim is a 1925 American silent drama film starring Percy Marmont (in the title role), Noah Beery, and Duke Kahanamoku.  The film was directed by Victor Fleming and based on the 1900 novel Lord Jim by Joseph Conrad.

Plot
As described in a review in a film magazine, Jim (Marmont) is a seaman who joins a cowardly captain and his stenchful crew in deserting a boatload of Muslim pilgrims on their way to Mecca. He is hypnotized into turning his back on his duty, but hypnotism is no alibi in an Admiralty Court and he loses his mate's certificate. The stigma follows him until an understanding merchant sends him to a remote Malay settlement, where he grows in power until he shares authority with the son of the Rajah. The captain and his crew, likewise blacklisted, have turned pirates and are led to the settlement by the former factor at the settlement, whom Jim has kept on through a fellow feeling of pity until he has become impossible. The same pity for the under dog leads him to turn the pirates loose, and they repay his generous act by killing the son of the Rajah. Jim pays with his own life for the loss of the Rajah's son.

Cast

Preservation
A print of Lord Jim is preserved at the Library of Congress and the UCLA Film and Television Archive.

References

External links

 
 
 
 
 The AFI Catalog of Feature Films:Lord Jim
 Lobby poster for Lord Jim
 Other movie posters: #1, ..#2

1925 films
1925 drama films
Silent American drama films
American silent feature films
American black-and-white films
1920s English-language films
Films based on British novels
Films based on works by Joseph Conrad
Films directed by Victor Fleming
Paramount Pictures films
Surviving American silent films
1920s American films
Films with screenplays by John Russell (screenwriter)
Films about hypnosis
Pirate films
Silent adventure films